Kevin B. Ford (born 22 December 1967) is an American mathematician working in analytic number theory.

Education and career
He has been a professor in the department of mathematics of the University of Illinois at Urbana-Champaign since 2001. Prior to this appointment, he was a faculty member at the University of South Carolina.

Ford received a Bachelor of Science in Computer Science and Mathematics in 1990 from the California State University, Chico. He then attended the University of Illinois at Urbana-Champaign, where he completed his doctoral studies in 1994 under the supervision of Heini Halberstam.

Research
Ford's early work focused on the distribution of Euler's totient function.

In 1999, he settled Sierpinski’s conjecture.

In August 2014, Kevin Ford, in collaboration with Green, Konyagin and Tao, 
.
resolved a longstanding conjecture of Erdős on large gaps between primes, also proven independently by James Maynard
. 
The five mathematicians were awarded for their work the largest Erdős prize ($10,000) ever offered.
 In 2017, they improved their results in a joint paper.

He is one of the namesakes of the Erdős–Tenenbaum–Ford constant, named for his work using it in estimating the number of small integers that have divisors in a given interval.

Recognition
In 2013, he became a fellow of the American Mathematical Society.

References

20th-century American mathematicians
21st-century American mathematicians
1967 births
Living people
Number theorists
University of Illinois Urbana-Champaign faculty
Fellows of the American Mathematical Society